The Consortium for North American Higher Education Collaboration (CONAHEC) is a non-profit membership organization which advises and connects higher education institutions interested in establishing or strengthening academic collaborative programs in the North American region. 

Its core membership is composed by colleges and universities from Canada, the United States and Mexico. Since 2008, its membership has expanded to include participation of key higher education institutions from other countries. 

CONAHEC fosters academic collaboration among higher educacion institutions and it has developed a successful partnership with  the key national umbrella higher education organizations in the North American Free Trade Agreement (NAFTA) region: the American Council on Education (ACE), the American Association of Community Colleges (AACC), the Association of Universities and Colleges of Canada (AUCC), the Association of Canadian Community Colleges and the Asociación Nacional de Universidades e Instituciones de Educación Superior (ANUIES) from Mexico.
   
With more than 170 member institutions, today, CONAHEC is the largest and most comprehensive network of institutions from the NAFTA region, offering student exchanges, annual conferences, professional development programs, and direct advise to its members.

History 

CONAHEC was founded in 1994 as the U.S.-Mexico Educational Interchange Project, co-convened by the Western Interstate Commission for Higher Education and the Mexican Association for International Education (AMPEI). Later, in 1997, the organization adopted its current name and official trinational scope.

Activities 

CONAHEC member institutions have established a series of services, including:
 North American Student Exchange Program. 
 Online information services and institutional "matchmaking". 
 North American Higher Education Conference.
 Student Organization of North America.
 Regional executive workshops. 
 Intensive language, culture, and higher education immersion programs. 
 Specialized publications.
 Faculty Mobility Program

Secretariat 

CONAHEC is headquartered at the University of Arizona in Tucson, Arizona.

Governance leadership

Executive leadership 

1994-2012 - Executive director: Francisco Marmolejo
2012-2018 - Executive director: Sean Manley-Casimir

Member List 
Current members include the following:

Canada 
Brock University
Canadian Bureau for International Education
Colleges and Institutes Canada
Georgian College
Langara College
McMaster University
Memorial University
Mount Royal University
Organización Universitaria Interamericana
Selkirk College
Universities Canada
University of Regina
University of the Fraser Valley

Mexico 
Asociación Mexicana para la Educación Internacional
Asociación Nacional de Universidades e Instituciones de Educación Superior
Asociación Nacional de Universidades Politécnicas
Asociación Nacional de Universidades Tecnológicas
Benemérita Universidad Autónoma de Puebla
Centro de Enseñanza Técnica y Superior
Centro de Estudios Universitarios
Consorcio de Universidades Mexicanas
Federación de Instituciones Mexicanas Particulares de Educación Superior (FIMPES)
Instituto de Estudios Superiores de Tamaulipas
Instituto Tecnológico de Sonora
Instituto Tecnológico y de Estudios Superiores de Occidente
Universidad Anáhuac Oaxaca
Universidad Anáhuac Cancún
Universidad Anáhuac Mayab
Universidad Anáhuac México
Universidad Anáhuac Puebla
Universidad Anáhuac Querétaro
Universidad Anáhuac Xalapa
Universidad Autónoma de Aguascalientes
Universidad Autónoma de Baja California
Universidad Autónoma de Chiapas
Universidad Autónoma de Chihuahua
Universidad Autónoma de Ciudad Juárez
Universidad Autónoma de Coahuila
Universidad Autónoma de Guadalajara
Universidad Autónoma de Guerrero
Universidad Autónoma de la Laguna
Universidad Autónoma de Nuevo León
Universidad Autónoma de Occidente
Universidad Autónoma de San Luis Potosí
Universidad Autónoma de Sinaloa
Universidad Autónoma de Tamaulipas
Universidad Autónoma del Estado de Hidalgo
Universidad Autonoma del Estado de Mexico
Universidad Autónoma del Noreste
Universidad de Colima
Universidad de Guadalajara
Universidad de Monterrey
Universidad de Quintana Roo
Universidad de Sonora
Universidad de Tijuana
Universidad del Caribe
Universidad del Noreste
Universidad del Pedregal
Universidad del Valle de Puebla, S.C.
Universidad Estatal de Sonora
Universidad Iberoamericana
Universidad Kino A.C.
Universidad La Salle
Universidad Latina de América
Universidad Marista de Merida, A.C.
Universidad Nacional Autónoma de México
Universidad Politecnica Metropolitana de Hidalgo
Universidad Popular Autónoma del Estado de Puebla
Universidad Vasco de Quiroga, A.C.
Universidad Veracruzana
Universidad Xochicalco

United States 
American Association of Community Colleges
American Association of State Colleges and Universities
American Council on Education
Association of International Education Administrators
Border Trade Alliance
California Colleges for International Education
California State University, Fullerton
Chamber of the Americas
City University of Seattle
Dallas County Community College District
Dominican University of California
Eastern New Mexico University
Institute of International Education
Inter American University of Puerto Rico
Lenoir-Rhyne University
Lyon College
Methodist University
Network of International Education Associations
New Mexico State University
Scholars at Risk
Texas A&M International University
The Forum on Education Abroad
University of Arizona
University of Missouri
University of San Diego
University of Texas at El Paso
Wayne State University
West Virginia University
Western Interstate Commission for Higher Education
Western New Mexico University

Affiliate Members 
Argentina
Universidad Nacional de Quilmes
Universidad Nacional del Nordeste
Bolivia
Universidad Católica Boliviana - San Pablo
Universidad del Valle, Bolivia
Brazil
Universidade Estadual Paulista Júlio de Mesquita Filho (UNESP)
Universidade Federal do Paraná
Chile
Universidad de Santiago de Chile
Universidad San Sebastián
Colombia
Escuela Tecnologica Instituto Tecnico Central
Fundación Universitaria Navarra (UniNavarra)
Pontificia Universidad Javeriana
Universidad del Norte
Universidad Simón Bolívar
Dominican Republic
Instituto Tecnológico de Santo Domingo
Ecuador
Universidad ECOTEC
Universidad Técnica Particular de Loja
Germany
University of Potsdam
Jamaica
Association of Caribbean Universities and Research Institutes
Korea
Asia-Pacific Association for International Education
Hankuk University of Foreign Studies
Hanyang University
Peru
Universidad Peruana de Ciencias Aplicadas
Spain
Compostela Group of Universities
Universidad de Oviedo
Universidad del País Vasco
Taiwan
Taiwan MingDao University
United Kingdom
University for the Creative Arts

See also 
 International education
 Western Interstate Commission for Higher Education

References

External links 
 
 American Council on Education (ACE)
 American Association of Community Colleges (AACC)
 Colleges and Institutes Canada (CiCAN)
 Asociación Nacional de Universidades e Instituciones de Enseñanza Superior (ANUIES)
 NAFTA Secretariat website
 North American Development Bank (NADBANK)

Educational organizations based in the United States
Organizations established in 1994
College and university associations and consortia in North America